The year 2018 is the 9th year in the history of the Road Fighting Championship, a mma promotion based in South Korea. 2018 started with Road FC 046 and ended with Road FC 051 XX.

List of events

Road FC 051 XX 

Xiaomi Road FC 051 XX  was an MMA event held by Road FC on December 15, 2018 at the Convention Centre, Grand Hilton Seoul in Seoul, South Korea. The 3rd event 'Road FC 045 XX' of the all-female MMA league Road FC XX was held on the main card. The event streamed live on DAZN in the United States.

Fight card

Road FC 050 

Xiaomi Road FC 050  was an MMA event held by Road FC on November 3, 2018 at the Chungmu Gymnasium in Daejeon, South Korea. The event streamed live on DAZN in the United States.

Fight card

Road FC 049: in Paradise 

Xiaomi Road FC 049 in Paradise is an MMA event scheduled to be held by Road FC on August 18, 2018 at the Grand Walkerhill Seoul, Seoul

Fight card

Road FC 048 

Xiaomi Road FC 048  was an MMA event held by Road FC on July 28, 2018 at the Jangchung Gymnasium in Seoul, South Korea.

Fight card

Road FC 047 

Xiaomi Road FC 047 was an MMA event held by Road FC on May 12, 2018 at the Cadillac Arena in Beijing, China.

Results

Road FC 046 

Xiaomi Road FC 046 was an MMA event held by Road FC on March 10, 2018 at the Jangchung Gymnasium in Seoul, South Korea.

Results

See also
 List of Road FC events
 List of Road FC champions
 List of current Road FC fighters
 List of current mixed martial arts champions

References 

Road Fighting Championship events
2018 in mixed martial arts
2018 in South Korean sport
2018 in Asian sport